Scalp defects-postaxial polydactyly syndrome is a very rare genetic disorder which is characterized by congenital defects of the scalp and type A postaxial polydactyly. An additional finding is severe intellectual disability. It is thought to be inherited in an autosomal dominant manner. Approximately 9 cases from two families have been described in medical literature.

References 

Genetic diseases and disorders
Autosomal dominant disorders